Sergey Bychkov (born 1 September 1975) is a Russian sprinter. He competed in the men's 100 metres at the 2000 Summer Olympics.

References

1975 births
Living people
Place of birth missing (living people)
Russian male sprinters
Olympic male sprinters
Olympic athletes of Russia
Athletes (track and field) at the 2000 Summer Olympics
Athletes (track and field) at the 2004 Summer Olympics
Russian Athletics Championships winners
20th-century Russian people